Rosthern was a constituency of the Legislative Assembly of Saskatchewan from 1971 to 2003. The area covered by the district is now part of Rosthern-Shellbrook and Martensville-Warman.

Geography 
The riding was based around the town of Rosthern, Saskatchewan.

Representation 

 John Michael Uhrich (1921 to 1944)
Peter J. Hooge
Walter Tucker (1948, 1952)
Samuel Henry Carr (1953 to 1958)
Isaak Elias (1956 to 1960)
William Neudorf (1986 to 1995)

References 

Former provincial electoral districts of Saskatchewan